Edwin Jenkyn (18 July 1876 – 7 May 1947) was an Australian rules footballer who played with Melbourne in the Victorian Football League (VFL). He served in the First Australian Imperial Force in World War I.

Notes

External links 

 

1876 births
1947 deaths
Australian rules footballers from Victoria (Australia)
Melbourne Football Club players
Brighton Football Club players
Australian military personnel of World War I
People educated at Wesley College (Victoria)
People from Shepparton
Military personnel from Victoria (Australia)